Uroš Predić (Orlovat, 7 December 1857 – Belgrade, 12 February 1953) was a Serbian Realist painter. Along with Paja Jovanović and Đorđe Krstić, he is considered the most important Serbian painter of realism. Predić is best remembered for his early works, in which he depicted the "real" life of ordinary people. Later, he made a great contribution in church painting and portraits. Predić's opus includes a total of 1658 works.

Biography

He was born in Orlovat, and attended primary school in Crepaja. After finishing his secondary education in Pančevo (this school was later named after him), he went to Vienna to study at the academy in 1876. He graduated from the Academy of Fine Arts of Vienna in 1880. He studied in the class of professor Christian Griepenkerl, who also taught Predić's contemporary Paja Jovanović. During his studies, he received the Gundel's prize – for a male model painting in oil. In 1882, he worked in private studio of professor Grieppenkerl, and in the period from 1883 to 1885 he was an assistant professor of the Department of Antiquity at the Art academy in Vienna. During that time, under the instruction of professor Grieppenkerl, and the architect Theophil Freiherr von Hansen, he painted 13 wall paintings of ancient, historical and mythological compositions for the frieze in the House of Lords at the Reichsratsgebäude (Imperial Council Building) in Vienna.

In 1885, he returned to Orlovat, where he painted a series of paintings about the life of his fellow villagers. After that, from 1886 to 1889, he lived in Belgrade, and from 1890 to 1893 in Novi Sad and Stari Bečej. From 1894 to 1909, Predić lived in Orlovat, and from 1909, until his death, he lived and worked in Belgrade. The first exhibition of his paintings was in 1888 in Belgrade.  He was elected to the group of painters who represented Serbia at the 1889 Exposition Universelle in Paris. In a small gallery he presented the 8 oil paintings. Although the French critics did not recognize his work Predić will become very popular in Serbia, especially because of the sense of humor shown in some works. He had many exhibitions, both in Serbia and aboard. Later his output was mainly portraits and icons.

He was one of the founders of the "Lada" society in 1904, and became its president. He was elected as associate member of the Serbian Royal Academy on 26 January 1909, and on 3 February 1910 as a regular member. Predić exhibited his artworks as a part of Kingdom of Serbia's pavilion at International Exhibition of Art of 1911.
He was one of the founders of the Society of painters in Belgrade in 1919, and was its first president. Predić painted the icons for the Bečej orthodox church, and the icons for the chapel of Bogdan Dunđerski. He died in 1953 in Belgrade, at the age of 95. He was buried in Orlovat.

Works
Some of his famous works include Merry brothers, Orphan (on mother's grave), the historical painting Bosnia-Herzegovinian fugitives and perhaps his most recognizable Kosovo Maiden. Predić also painted the famous portraits of the presidents of Serbian academy: 
Sima Lozanić, Stojan Novaković (1920), Jovan Žujović (1921), Jovan Cvijić (1923), Slobodan Jovanović (1930), Bogdan Gavrilović (1935) Aleksandar Belić (1940). He also painted portraits of Michael I. Pupin, Laza Kostić, Mihailo Petrović Alas (1943), Ksenija Atanasijević (1917), Branislav Petronijević (1911) amongst others.

Gallery

See also 
Serbian art
Paja Jovanović
Đorđe Krstić

References

External links 

Icons in Bečej church

1857 births
1953 deaths
People from Zrenjanin
Realist painters
Eastern Orthodox Christians from Serbia
19th-century Serbian painters
Serbian male painters
20th-century Serbian painters
19th-century Serbian male artists
20th-century Serbian male artists